Mierucin may refer to:

Mierucin, Mogilno County, Poland
Mierucin, Sępólno County, Poland